IPFlex (アイピーフレックス) was a fabless semiconductor company based in Tokyo, Japan. It was founded in 2000 by Tomoyoshi Sato. The company closed in July 2009 after consuming 6 billion yen (approx $60M USD) of venture funding.

The company created the DAP/DNA-2 Dynamically Reconfigurable Processor Architecture. The DAP/DNA-2 is a combination of a coarse grain dynamically Reconfigurable datapath array (DNA) and a conventional RISC controller (DAP). The DNA processor array includes several hundred independent 32 bit or 16 bit processing elements (PE).

The technology has been included in products by some large Japanese companies, Fuji Xerox, Ricoh, and Toshiba Tec.
 
The DAP/DNA-2 technology has been owned and developed by Tokyo Keiki, Inc. since May 2010.

External links
http://www.eetimes.com/electronics-news/4196916/Reconfigurable-Processors-Changing-the-Systems-Design-Paradigm
http://www.eetimes.com/electronics-news/4060902/COMPANIES-TO-WATCH-item-1
http://www.tokyo-keiki.co.jp/hyd/j/products/dapdna_index.html (Japanese)

References 

Companies established in 2000
Parallel computing
Reconfigurable computing
Fabless semiconductor companies
Semiconductor companies of Japan